The Lively Arts was a weekly half-hour CBC Television programme about arts and culture.  It ran from October 1961 to June 1964.  The show was composed of filmed and studio interviews, either produced by the CBC or purchased from the BBC and others.

References

1961 Canadian television series debuts
1964 Canadian television series endings
CBC Television original programming